Or Goren (אור גורן; born October 20, 1956) is an Israeli former basketball player. He played the shooting guard position. He scored the fifth-most career points in Israeli Basketball Premier League history, and also played for the Israeli national basketball team.

Biography
Goren was born in Israel, and lived in Kibbutz Mishmar HaEmek, Israel. His father Adam was a basketball player.

He attended the University of Houston, and played basketball for the Houston Cougars in 1978–80.

Goren played for Hapoel Megido, Hapoel Gvat/Yagur, Hapoel Ramat Gan, Elitzur Netanya, Hapoel Galil Elyon, Beitar Tel Aviv, and Maccabi Hadera from 1973 to 1993. He scored 6,606 career points in the Israeli Basketball Premier League, 5th-most in league history.

He played for the Israeli national basketball team. Goren played in the 1973 FIBA European Championship for Cadets, 1974 FIBA European Championship for Junior Men, 1975 FIBA European Championship for Men, 1976 FIBA European Olympic Qualifying Tournament for Men, 1976 FIBA Pre-Olympic Basketball Tournament, 1977 FIBA European Championship for Men, and 1980 FIBA European Olympic Qualifying Tournament for Men.

See also
Israeli Basketball Premier League Statistical Leaders

References 

1956 births
Israeli men's basketball players
Hapoel Holon players
Hapoel Galil Elyon players
Israeli Basketball Premier League players
Kibbutzniks
Houston Cougars men's basketball players
Living people